Howard McKay was a state representative in Arkansas. He represented Jefferson County, Arkansas, and was one of at least four African Americans in the Arkansas House of Representatives in 1893. George W. Bell was serving in the state senate. He and other Arkansas legislators were photographed in 1893.

See also
African-American officeholders during and following the Reconstruction era

References

People from Jefferson County, Arkansas
Members of the Arkansas House of Representatives
African-American state legislators in Arkansas
19th-century American politicians